In mathematics, Artin–Verdier duality is a duality theorem for constructible abelian sheaves over the spectrum of a ring of algebraic numbers, introduced by , that generalizes Tate duality.

It shows that, as far as etale (or flat) cohomology is concerned, the ring of integers in a number field behaves like a 3-dimensional mathematical object.

Statement 
Let X be the spectrum of the ring of integers in a totally imaginary number field K, and F a constructible étale abelian sheaf on X. Then the Yoneda pairing

is a non-degenerate pairing of finite abelian groups, for every integer r.

Here, Hr(X,F) is the r-th étale cohomology group of the scheme X with values in F, and Extr(F,G) is the group of r-extensions of the étale sheaf G by the étale sheaf F in the category of étale abelian sheaves on X. Moreover, Gm denotes the étale sheaf of units in the structure sheaf of X.

 proved Artin–Verdier duality for constructible, but not necessarily torsion sheaves. For such a sheaf F, the above pairing induces isomorphisms

where

Finite flat group schemes 
Let U be an open subscheme of the spectrum of the ring of integers in a number field K, and F a finite flat commutative group scheme over U. Then the cup product defines a non-degenerate pairing

of finite abelian groups, for all integers r.

The flat cohomology with compact supports is defined to give rise to a long exact sequence

The sum is taken over all places of K, which are not in U, including the archimedean ones. The local contribution Hr(Kv, F) is the Galois cohomology of the Henselization Kv of K at the place v, modified a la Tate:

Here  is a separable closure of

References

Theorems in number theory
Duality theories